Hotel Timor is a hotel in the centre of East Timor's capital, Dili.

History 
Construction of the hotel, initially called Mahkota, began in 1972. It opened in 1976 and operated continuously until September 1999, when it was burned down by pro-Indonesian militias. Before that it was leading Hotel Dili.

In order to be able to offer state guests adequate accommodation for the celebrations of East Timor's independence in 2002, the restoration of the hotel began. Fundação Oriente and the East Timor government shared the cost of $6 million. Guests included Lula da Silva, Kofi Annan, Bill Clinton , Ban Ki-moon, António Guterres, Mahathir bin Mohamad, John Howard, Tony Blair and Gordon Brown.

References 

Timor
1970s architecture
Buildings and structures in Dili
Burned buildings and structures
Hotels established in 1976